Mycobacterium avium subsp. silvaticum is a species of the phylum Actinomycetota (Gram-positive bacteria with high guanine and cytosine content, one of the dominant phyla of all bacteria), belonging to the genus Mycobacterium.

Type strain: strain 6409 = ATCC 49884 = CCUG 47446 = CIP 103317 = DSM 44175.

Mycobacterium avium subsp. silvaticum Thorel et al. 1990 was previously known as Mycobacterium avium strain wood pigeon.

References

Acid-fast bacilli
avium silvaticum
Bacteria described in 1990